Atactosturmia is a genus of bristle flies in the family Tachinidae. There are at least two described species in Atactosturmia.

Species
These two species belong to the genus Atactosturmia:
 Atactosturmia politana (Townsend, 1911) c g
 Atactosturmia vittata Thompson, 1963 c g
Data sources: i = ITIS, c = Catalogue of Life, g = GBIF, b = Bugguide.net

References

Further reading

External links

 
 

Tachinidae